Sir Francis Freeling, 1st Baronet FSA (25 August 1764 – 10 July 1836), was Secretary of the General Post Office.

He was born in Bristol, on 25 August 1764.

Career
Freeling started work in the Bristol Post Office. In 1785 he was promoted, to a post in London, to develop the service. In 1797, he rose to the office of joint Secretary to the Post Office and in 1798, sole Secretary.

He initiated many reforms to the Post Office, including the introduction of local penny posts in large towns, the reorganization of London's postal service and the use of steam trains and steamships to replace horse-drawn vehicles and wind-powered ships.

On 11 March 1828, a baronetcy was conferred upon him, of the General Post Office in the City of London and of Ford and Hutchings in the County of Sussex, for his public service.

Personal life
Freeling collected a large library. He was elected a fellow of the Society of Antiquaries of London in 1801, and was one of the original members of the Roxburghe Club, founded in 1812.

Freeling was married three times and had many children. On his death on 10 July 1836, he was succeeded in the baronetcy by his eldest surviving son, Sir George Henry Freeling (22 September 1789 – 30 November 1841). The eldest daughter, Charlotte, married James Heywood Markland.

References

1764 births
1836 deaths
Civil servants from Bristol
Baronets in the Baronetage of the United Kingdom
Fellows of the Society of Antiquaries of London
Burials at Kensal Green Cemetery